William Murray Birtwistle (born 4 July 1939) is a former New Zealand rugby union player. He played 12 matches for the All Blacks including seven internationals.

References

1939 births
Living people
Rugby union players from Auckland
People educated at Mount Roskill Grammar School
New Zealand rugby union players
New Zealand international rugby union players
Auckland rugby union players
Canterbury rugby union players
Waikato rugby union players
Rugby union wings